The 1913 Chicago Maroons football team was an American football team that represented the University of Chicago as a member of the  Western Conference during the 1913 college football season. In coach Amos Alonzo Stagg's 22nd year as head coach, the Maroons finished with a 7–0 record and outscored opponents by a total of 124 to 27. 

There was no contemporaneous system in 1914 for determining a national champion. However, Chicago was retroactively named as the 1914 national champion by the Billingsley Report and as a co-national champion by Parke H. Davis.

Center Paul Des Jardien was a consensus first-team selection on the 1913 All-America college football team. He was inducted into the College Football Hall of Fame in 1955. Other notable players on the 1913 Chicago team included halfback Nelson Norgren, quarterback Paul Russell, and end Huntington.

Schedule

References

Chicago
Chicago Maroons football seasons
College football national champions
Big Ten Conference football champion seasons
College football undefeated seasons
Chicago Football